Lindisfarne is a tidal island off Northumberland, England.

Lindisfarne may also refer to:

Music
Lindisfarne (band), a British folk/rock band
Lindisfarne (song), a song by James Blake

Places
Lindisfarne, Tasmania, suburb of Hobart, Tasmania, Australia
Lindisfarne, Montana, census-designated place in United States

Schools
Lindisfarne College
Lindisfarne College, New Zealand
Lindisfarne Anglican Grammar School

Other uses
Lindisfarne Castle, a castle on Lindisfarne, Northumberland
 Lindisfarne, a fictional English hedgehog from Kevin & Kell

See also 
 Holy Island (disambiguation)
Lindisfarne Association, a group of intellectuals founded by William Irwin Thompson
Lindisfarne Gospels, created on Lindisfarne, Northumberland
Lindisfarne Mead, a fortified drink from the island
Oscar Murton, Baron Murton of Lindisfarne, (19142009), British politician